Vicente Greco (February 3, 1888 – October 5, 1924) was an Argentinian composer, conductor, and bandoneon player of tango music.  He had a significant role in the spread of tango music from the suburbs into the cities, where it became very popular.

Life story
He was born in Buenos Aires, the son of Genaro Greco and Victoria Santo, a couple of modest means who brought up Vicente and seven other children.  His family's low income caused Vicente to work from a young age; his schooling was interrupted, and he instead became a newsboy in the streets of Buenos Aires. Some of his siblings were also musically-inclined.  Vicente's musical career began around 1903 during his teens, when he played guitar complemented by singing, for fun.

Greco learned to play a concertina that had been gifted to his parents, who later gave the 14-year-old prodigy a bandoneon of his own. The first tango he played was "La Tirana", and he initially worked in bars and lounges that were popular in La Boca, one of the main immigrant neighborhoods in Buenos Aires. He debuted in San Pedro, later playing San Nicolás, Baradero, Rosario, and elsewhere.

In San Pedro, he was able to know and play music with leading performers of his era, including Prudencio Aragón (nicknamed El Johnny), Ernesto Zambonini (El Rengo), Lorenzo (El Negro) and Juan Borguessi (El Taruguito); but in San Pedro he also had a serious accident due to a stage collapse, which could have contributed to his early death.

Greco obtained a harmonium that he used for practice and for composing. He had dark eyes, and was short, with a tendency toward frequent good humor. He led the first group known as an orquesta típica, which means an orchestra specializing in tango, and that group was called Orquesta Típica Criolla.

As a self-taught musician, he initially needed the help of fellow musicians to commit his music to paper. Also in 1911, he was the first tango musician to be hired at the Armenonville, a musical cabaret that became one of the main centers of diffusion of the tango.

His tangos sold well; 22,000 copies of his first tango El morochito (written in 1905) were sold, "Rodríguez Peña" sold 12,000 copies, and "El flete" sold 6,000 copies in three months.  Numbers such as "Rodríguez Peña", "La viruta" or El flete, were classics of the genre.  The famous singer Carlos Gardel was his personal friend and a musical collaborator.

Greco's recording work began around 1910. He was accompanied by the same instrumentalists with whom he had already appeared at the Café El Estribo: Lorenzo Labissier (bandoneon), Domingo Greco (piano), Vicente Pecci (El Tano) (flute) and Palito Abatte or, on occasions, Francisco Canaro (violin).

Tangos by Greco

 Alma porteña
 Argentina
 Ausencia
 Barba’e choclo
 Chicotazo
 Criollo viejo
 De raza
 El cuzquito
 El eléctrico
 El estribo
 El flete
 El garrotazo
 El mejicano
 El morochito (1905)
 El pangaré
 El pato de la Z
 El perverso
 El pibe
 Estoy penando
 Italianita
 Kiki
 La canota
 La gauchita
 La infanta
 La milonguera
 La paica
 La percanta está triste
 La regadera
 La viruta
 Los soñadores
 María Angélica
 Máscara dura
 Montaraz
 Muela careada
 Noche brava
 Ojos negros (1910)
 Pachequito
 Pobre corazoncito
 Popoff
 Pueyrredón
 ¡Qué nene!
 Racing Club
 Rodríguez Peña
 Saladillo
 Zazá

References

External links

Argentine composers
1888 births
1924 deaths